The Pittsburgh, Allegheny and McKees Rocks Railroad  is a switching railroad that serves industrial complexes in McKees Rocks, Pennsylvania. It formerly served the Baltimore and Ohio Railroad (former Pittsburgh and Western Railway) yard across the Ohio River via a car ferry service, operated with the steamboat "Steel Queen".

Interchanges
McKees Rocks
P&OC
CSX

Roster

References

Related links

Western Pennsylvanian Railroads:Pittsburgh, Allegheny & McKees Rocks Railroad
PAM Roster

Pennsylvania railroads
Switching and terminal railroads